The 2022 Furman Paladins football team represented Furman University as a member of the Southern Conference (SoCon) during the 2022 NCAA Division I FCS football season. The Paladins were led by sixth-year head coach Clay Hendrix and played their home games at Paladin Stadium in Greenville, South Carolina.

With a win over Elon in the first round of the 2022 NCAA Division I Football Championship, Furman completed their first 10-win season for the first time since 2005. They would fall to Incarnate Word in the second round.

Previous season

The Paladins finished the 2021 season with a record of 6–5, 4–4 SoCon play to finish a 3 way tie for fourth place.

Schedule

Game summaries

North Greenville

at No. 5 (FBS) Clemson

at No. 18 East Tennessee State

at Charleston Southern

No. 16 Samford

at The Citadel

Western Carolina

at VMI

No. 7 Chattanooga

at No. 14 Mercer

Wofford

FCS Playoffs

No. 12 Elon – First Round

at No. 5 Incarnate Word – Second Round

References

Furman
Furman Paladins football seasons
Furman Paladins football
Furman